Kočilari is a village in the municipality of Gradsko, North Macedonia.

Demographics
On his 1927 ethnic map of Leonhard Schulze-Jena, the village is written as Kodžilar and as a fully Turkish village.

As of the 2021 census, Kočilari had 113 residents with the following ethnic composition:
Albanians 72
Others (including Torbeš) 15
Turks 15
Macedonians 5
Persons for whom data are taken from administrative sources 5
Bosniaks 1

According to the 2002 census, the village had a total of 130 inhabitants. Ethnic groups in the village include:
Albanians 105
Turks 19 
Macedonians 6

References

Villages in Gradsko Municipality
Albanian communities in North Macedonia